William Ferguson Colcock (November 5, 1804 – June 13, 1889) was a U.S. Representative from South Carolina.

Born in Beaufort, South Carolina, Colcock attended Hulburt's School, Charleston, South Carolina, and was graduated from South Carolina College (now the University of South Carolina) at Columbia in 1823.
He studied law.
He was admitted to the bar in 1825 and commenced practice in Coosawhatchie, South Carolina.
He also engaged in planting.
He served as member of the State house of representatives 1830–1847.

Colcock was elected as a Democrat to the Thirty-first and Thirty-second Congresses (March 4, 1849 – March 3, 1853).
He was a Regent of the Smithsonian Institution 1850–1853.
He served as collector of the port of Charleston 1853–1865, serving first under the United States Government and subsequently under the Confederate States Government.
He served as delegate to the Democratic National Convention at Charleston in 1860.
He resumed the practice of law.
He died in McPhersonville, Hampton County, South Carolina, on June 13, 1889.  He was interred in Stoney Creek Cemetery, South Carolina.

Sources

1804 births
1889 deaths
Democratic Party members of the United States House of Representatives from South Carolina
Democratic Party members of the South Carolina House of Representatives
19th-century American politicians